The president of the Royal Society (PRS) is the elected Head of the Royal Society of London who presides over meetings of the society's council.

After informal meetings at Gresham College, the Royal Society was officially founded on 28 November 1660 when a group of academics decided to find "a College for the Promoting of Mathematicall Experimentall Learning", acquiring a Royal Charter on 15 July 1662. The Royal Charter nominated William Brouncker as president, and stipulated that future presidents should be elected by the Council and Fellows of the society at anniversary meetings each year on St. Andrew's Day (30 November).

The details of the presidency were described by the second Royal Charter, which did not set any limit on how long a president could serve. There were considerable fluctuations in the president's term of office until well into the 19th century. By then, sentiment had turned against electing wealthy amateurs solely because they might become patrons of the society, and in 1847 the society decided that Fellows would be elected solely on scientific merit. Since the 1870s, it has been usual (with a few exceptions) for each President to serve for exactly five years. Under the current statutes, a president cannot serve for more than five years. The current President is Sir Adrian Smith who began his 5-year tenure on 30th November 2020.

Historically, the duties of the president have been both formal and social. Under the Cruelty to Animals Act 1876, the President was one of only a few people authorised to certify that a particular experiment on an animal was justified, and in addition he acted as the government's chief (albeit informal) advisor for scientific matters. At the same time, the President was tasked with entertaining distinguished foreign guests and scientists.

The changeover of presidents occurs on the Royal Society Anniversary Day, the weekday on or nearest to 30 November, after the departing President's Anniversary Address. Of the 26 presidents since 1901, 18 have been Nobel laureates (seven in Physiology or Medicine, four in Physics and seven in Chemistry). Many past presidents, including all those in the 20th century, have been appointed to the Order of Merit.

Sir Joseph Banks was the longest serving president of Royal Society.

Presidents of the Royal Society

References

Notes

Sources

Royal Society
Lists of British people
 
Royal Society
Lists of members of learned societies